South Salem is the name of several places in the United States:

South Salem, Indiana
Salem south is assembly constituency in TamilNadu
South Salem Township, Kansas
South Salem, New York, a hamlet in Westchester County
South Salem, Ohio, a village in Ross County